Anastrus is a genus of skippers in the family Hesperiidae.

Species
The following species are  recognised in the genus Anastrus:
 Anastrus luctuosus
 Anastrus meliboea
 Anastrus neaeris
 Anastrus obscurus
 Anastrus peruvianus
 Anastrus tolimus
 Anastrus ulpianus
 Anastrus virens

Former species
Anastrus sempiternus (Butler and Druce, 1872) - transferred to Echelatus sempiternus (Butler and Druce, 1872)

References
Natural History Museum Lepidoptera genus database

Erynnini
Hesperiidae genera
Taxa named by Jacob Hübner